Colombia has participated in all editions of the Pan American games since its inception in 1951, except in 1959 and 1963. Hurdler Jaime Aparicio Rodewaldt won the country's first medal at the inaugural edition of the games in Buenos Aires 1951, a gold medal at the 400 m hurdles. The country is ranked seventh in the all-time Pan American games medal table. Cali, the capital of the Colombian department of Valle del Cauca, held the 1971 Pan American Games, and to date, the only time Colombia hosted the games. Its best performance was at the 2019 Edition in Lima, where it earned 28 golden medals, however, their best rank was at Toronto 2015 ranking fifth. The nation has won a total of 136 golden medals, and 568 overall, with weightlifting, roller skating, and cycling as the most successful sports.

Medal Count

Summer

Winter

Medals by sport

Parapan American Games Medal Count
Colombia had participated in all editions of the Parapan American Games, since 1999. As of the 2015 edition, it ranks in the eighth place of the all-time medal table of the competition. The country has won 51 golden medals, and 193 overall.

See also 

 Colombia at the Olympics
 Colombia at the Paralympics
 Colombia at the Youth Olympics

References

External links
COC - Comité Olímpico Colombiano Official site.